Barcelos is a former civil parish, located in the municipality of Barcelos, Portugal. In 2013, the parish merged into the new parish Barcelos, Vila Boa e Vila Frescainha (São Martinho e São Pedro). The population in 2011 was 4,660, in an area of 1.30 km².

References

Former parishes of Barcelos, Portugal